The Battle of Tezirzait took place during the Tuareg rebellion (2007–09) around the town of Tezirzaït, Niger, in June 2008.

Tuareg rebellions
2008 in Niger
Tezirzait
June 2008 events in Africa